Katherine Tate (born November 8, 1962) is an American political scientist best known for her research on race and ethnic minority politics. She is a professor of Political Science at Brown University.

Biography
Tate received her B.A. in political science from the University of Chicago in 1983, and her M.A. in 1985 from the University of Michigan. She completed her Ph.D. in political science from Michigan in 1989. After working at Harvard University and serving as an associate professor of political science at Ohio State University she became a professor of Political Science at the University of California, Irvine.

Selected works
Tate is the author or co-author and co-editor of six books.
. Enlarged edition, 1994. This book was the winner of two book prizes, the Southern Political Science Association's 1994 V.O. Key Jr. book award and the National Conference of Black Political Scientists’ 1995 Outstanding Book Award.  
.
. This book won the 2004 V.O. Key Jr. book award, and was the co-winner of the 2004 Race, Ethnicity, and Politics Section book award and the 2005 co-winner of the National Conference of Black Political Scientists’ Outstanding Book Award. It was also named an outstanding academic title by Choice Magazine. 
.
.
 Tate, Katherine. (2013). Concordance: Black Lawmaking in the U.S. Congress from Carter to Obama. Ann Arbor, MI: University of Michigan Press. .

References

External links

http://www.faculty.uci.edu/profile.cfm?faculty_id=3222&term_list=tate
 https://www.nytimes.com/roomfordebate/2011/07/25/how-budget-cuts-will-change-the-black-middle-class/cuts-are-palatable-because-some-blacks-are-in-office

1962 births
Living people
University of Chicago alumni
University of Michigan alumni
University of California, Irvine faculty
American women political scientists
American political scientists
Brown University faculty
American women academics
21st-century American women